The Fairhaven Singers is a chamber choir based in Cambridge, UK, directed by Ralph Woodward. The choir is a mixed ensemble of about 48 amateur singers singing choral repertoire from the 15th century to the present. Among the major works it has performed are Bach's St John Passion and St Matthew Passion, Mozart's Requiem, Brahms' Requiem, and James MacMillan's Seven Last Words from the Cross. It has commissioned and premiered new works from composers that have included Jonathan Dove, Will Todd, Bob Chilcott, Carl Rütti and Cecilia MacDowall.

It performs mainly in Cambridge, most often in Trinity College Chapel, St John's College Chapel and Queens' College Chapel. It has also appeared at Snape Maltings Concert Hall, Suffolk, including concerts at the Aldeburgh Festival and Britten's War Requiem at the Britten Festival; at Ely Cathedral; at venues in London, including St Martin-in-the-Fields and St John's Smith Square; and at concert venues in Europe, including St Mark's Basilica, Venice.  It has also been featured on BBC Radio 2, BBC Radio 3, BBC Radio 4, and Classic FM.

The choir was founded in 1980, and is under the patronage of Lord Fairhaven of Anglesey Abbey.

Commissions and premières 

 Will Todd, Magnificat, 1997
 Richard Lloyd, A Garland of Praise, 1998
 Jake Howarth, Pied Beauty, 2008
 Graham Lack, Sanctus, 2009 (UK premiere)
 Will Todd, Requiem, 2009 
 Bob Chilcott, Ave Maria, 2010
 Carl Rütti, Amen, 2011
 Will Todd, Songs of Peace, 2012
 Joseph Phibbs, Lullay, lullay, thou lytil child, 2012
 Will Todd, Te Deum (string-orchestra version), 2013
 Thomas Hewitt Jones and Andrew Motion, Formation, 2013
 Somtow Sucharitkul, ClareVoyance, 2014
 Ēriks Ešenvalds, The Time Has Come
 Ralph Woodward, Summer Happiness, 2016
 Cecilia McDowall, God is Light, 2016
 Ola Gjeilo, LUX, 2017
 Geoff Page, Battle Cries, 2018
 Jonathan Dove, Sappho Sings, 2019
Alan Bullard, Beauty, Joy, 2021

Discography
The Blue Skies that Sparkle (2007)
Will Todd, Requiem (2009) - awarded five stars by Choir and Organ magazine 
Full of Grace: Songs to the Virgin (2011)
Into the Stars (2015) - music composed for the Fairhaven Singers

References

External links
 Official website
 Conductor Ralph Woodward

English choirs
Cambridge choirs
Musical groups established in 1980